Ajahn Sundara (born 1946) is a French-born Buddhist sīladhārā in the tradition established by Ajahn Sumedho.

Life
She studied contemporary dance and worked as a dancer and dance teacher until her early thirties when she had the opportunity to meet Ajahn Sumedho in England and to attend one of his Dhamma talks and then a retreat. She was one of the first four women ordained by Ajahn Sumedho in 1979 as an anagārikā (an eight-precept novice) and in 1983 as a ten-precept sīladhārā. After living at Chithurst Buddhist Monastery in England, Ajahn Sundara moved in 1984 to Amaravati Buddhist Monastery and was instrumental in founding the nuns' community there. She went to Thailand in the mid-1990s, where she spent more than two years, primarily on retreat at forest monasteries. She has been teaching and leading retreats in Europe and North America for many years. She currently resides at Amaravati Buddhist Monastery, whose history and relevance to women in Buddhism she has chronicled in the book chapter "The Theravada Sangha Goes West: The Story of Amaravati".

Publications

See also
Thai Forest Tradition
Ajahn Chah
Ajahn Sumedho
Ajahn Candasiri
Chithurst Buddhist Monastery
Amaravati Buddhist Monastery

References

External links
Amaravati Buddhist Monastery
Audio recordings of 19 Dharma talks in English on the Dharma Seed library
Discipline et Liberté a 2011 interview on the TV show Sagesse Boudhiste on France 2 retrieved from the French on-line magazine Bouddhisme au Feminin
Effort Juste a 2013 interview on the TV show Sagesse Boudhiste on France 2 retrieved from the French on-line magazine Bouddhisme au Feminin

1946 births
Living people
French scholars of Buddhism
Buddhist writers
Converts to Buddhism
French expatriates in Thailand
Theravada Buddhist monks
Thai Forest Tradition nuns
French Buddhist nuns
Sundara, Ajahn
20th-century Buddhist nuns
21st-century Buddhist nuns
20th-century French women